Prince Emmanuel of Belgium (Emmanuel Léopold Guillaume François Marie; born 4 October 2005) is the younger son and third child of King Philippe and Queen Mathilde of Belgium. He is currently third in line to the throne of Belgium after his elder sister, Princess Elisabeth, and brother, Prince Gabriel.

Life
Emmanuel was born on 4 October 2005 at the Erasmus Hospital the teaching hospital of Université libre de Bruxelles. He was christened at the chapel of Ciergnon Castle in the Belgian Ardennes on 10 December 2005. His godparents were: his maternal aunt Countess Elisabeth d'Udekem d'Acoz (Margravine Pallavicini) and Guillaume, Hereditary Grand Duke of Luxembourg.

In September 2012, it was announced that Emmanuel left St John Berchmans College, Brussels, the school his siblings also attended, to enroll at the Eureka special school in Kessel-Lo. The school caters to children of normal intelligence and gifted children who have dyslexia, which he has. In August 2020, it was reported that Emmanuel transferred to The International School of Brussels, an English-language private school in Watermael-Boitsfort, near Brussels, the same school his brother Gabriel attended from 2019 to 2021.

Emmanuel likes to practice cycling, swimming, skiing, and sailing. He also plays the flute and saxophone. He speaks French, Dutch, and English.

Arms

References

External links
Biography on the official website of the Belgian monarchy

|-

2005 births
Living people
People from Anderlecht
Princes of Saxe-Coburg and Gotha
House of Belgium
Royal children
Belgian people of Italian descent
Belgian people of Polish descent
Royalty and nobility with dyslexia
Sons of kings